The Germany women's national American football team is the official American football senior national team of  Germany.

History 
The team competed at the 2013 IFAF Women's World Championship, where they finished fourth after losing to Finland 20–19.

References 

American football in Germany
Women's national American football teams
American football